is a railway station in the city of Gujō, Gifu Prefecture, Japan, operated by the third sector railway operator Nagaragawa Railway.

Lines

Station layout
Gujō-Yamato Station has a two opposed ground-level side platforms connected to the station building by a level crossing. The station is staffed.

Adjacent stations

|-
!colspan=5|Nagaragawa Railway

History
Operations were transferred from the Japan National Railway (JNR) to the Nagaragawa Railway on December 11, 1986. The station was renamed to its present name on the same day.

Surrounding area
Nagara River

Yatomi Post Office
Yamato Middle School

See also
 List of Railway Stations in Japan

References

External links

 

Railway stations in Japan opened in 1932
Railway stations in Gifu Prefecture
Stations of Nagaragawa Railway
Gujō, Gifu